= Schultheater der Länder =

Theatre festival in Germany

Schultheater der Länder is a theatre festival in Germany. School theater groups from all the German states present their plays on changing themes.

The Schultheater der Länder was initiated by the Bundesverband Darstellendes Spiel (Federal Association for Performing Arts) with the support of the Körber Foundation in 1985 to promote the spread of school theater in Germany. This festival is not so much a competition as a forum for the exchange of experiences between students who are enthusiastic about theater, but also between teachers and theater professionals.
